Provincial Road 473 (PR 473) is a former provincial road in the Canadian province of Manitoba.

Route description 

The route began at PTH 16 east of Newdale, and intersected PR 270 about halfway between its western and eastern terminuses. From there, PR 473 continued east and terminated at PTH 10 just south of Minnedosa Valley. The route was gravel for its entire length.

History 

In the early 1990s, the Manitoba government decommissioned a number of provincial secondary roads and returned the maintenance of these roads back to the rural municipalities. PR 473 was one of the roads that was decommissioned entirely. The route is now maintained by the Rural Municipalities of Harrison Park and Clanwilliam.

After PR 473 was decommissioned, the route became known as Mile 91N.

References
  
 

473